The 1974 World 600, the 15th running of the event, was a NASCAR Winston Cup Series event that was held on May 26, 1974, at Charlotte Motor Speedway in Concord, North Carolina.

This would be the first time the World 600 and Indianapolis 500 were raced on the same day.

Race report
The race was shortened by 40 laps due to the energy crisis of that year.  The lead changed 37 times among David Pearson, Richard Petty, Cale Yarborough, Buddy Baker, and Donnie Allison.  Allison and Baker fell out with engine failures while Yarborough spun out early in the race, raced back to the front, then crashed out in the final 20 laps.

The race took three hours and fifty-eight minutes. Eight cautions slowed the race for 48 laps. Pearson defeated Petty by 0.6 seconds in front of eighty-four thousand people. The late Jim Vandiver came home in eighth place in his signature #31 Dodge. This would be Pearson's second World 600 victory. His first career Cup win was in this event  in 1961.

Sam McQuagg would make his final start in this race before retiring from NASCAR; McQuagg was teammates with Bobby Isaac; they retired on lap 187 due to vehicle problems. He would later become a commercial pilot for the W. C. Bradly Co. in Columbus, Georgia and would eventually die of cancer in 2009.

Individual earnings for each driver ranged from the winner's share of $26,400 ($ when adjusted for inflation) to the last-place finisher's share of $1,075 ($ when adjusted for inflation). NASCAR allocated a grand total of $167,305 ($ when adjusted for inflation).

Qualifying

Finishing order
Note: Each driver would get an additional 40 laps due to the then-current energy crisis (which officially ended in 1980).

 David Pearson† (No. 21)
 Richard Petty (No. 43)
 Bobby Allison (No. 12)
 Darrell Waltrip (No. 95)
 Earl Ross† (No. 52)
 Dave Marcis (No. 2)
 Dick Trickle† (No. 81)
 Jim Vandiver† (No. 31)
 David Sisco† (No. 05)
 J.D. McDuffie† (No. 70)
 Cale Yarborough* (No. 11)
 Walter Ballard (No. 30)
 Roy Mayne† (No. 25)
 Harry Gant (No. 5)
 James Hylton*† (No. 48)
 Neil Castles (No. 06)
 Frank Warren (No. 79)
 Dick Skillen (No. 78)
 Buddy Arrington* (No. 67)
 Lennie Pond*† (No. 54)
 Tony Bettenhausen Jr.† (No. 9)
 Buddy Baker*† (No. 15)
 Richie Panch*† (No. 98)
 Bill Scott* (No. 1)
 G.C. Spencer*† (No. 49)
 Travis Tiller* (No. 46)
 Dick Brooks*† (No. 32)
 Cecil Gordon*† (No. 24)
 Dan Daughtry* (No. 35)
 Donnie Allison* (No. 88)
 Benny Parsons*† (No. 72)
 Sam McQuagg*† (No. 28)
 Bobby Isaac*† (No. 29)
 Richard Childress* (No. 96)
 Randy Tissot* (No. 74)
 Bob Burcham*† (No. 57)
 Charlie Glotzbach* (No. 90)
 Coo Coo Marlin*† (No. 14)
 Jackie Rogers* (No. 93)
 Joe Frasson*† (No. 18)

† signifies that the driver is known to be deceased 
* Driver failed to finish race

References

World 600
World 600
NASCAR races at Charlotte Motor Speedway